"Dye My Hair" is a single and the debut extended play by Finnish singer-songwriter Alma. The song was released in Finland as a digital download on 28 October 2016 alongside a four-track EP. The song peaked at number 8 on the Finnish Singles Chart.

Music video
A music video to accompany the release of "Dye My Hair" was first released onto YouTube on 16 December 2016 at a total length of three minutes and twenty-eight seconds. As of October 2018, the song has received over 10 million views.

Track listing

Personnel
Credits adapted from Tidal.

Alma – vocals (all tracks)
Pascal Reinhardt – bass vocals (tracks 1, 3), mixing engineer (track 1, 3)
Lex Barkey – mastering engineer (tracks 1-3)
Jonas Mar – piano (track 1)
Jonas Kalisch – bass vocals (track 2)
Jeremy Chachon – drums (track 2)
Hitimpulse – mixing engineer (track 2)
Alexsej Vlasenko – piano (track 2)
Henrik Meinke – synthesizer (track 2)
Matti-Pekka Lehtinen – guitar (track 4)
Oskar Skaag – mixing engineer (track 4)
Minerva Pappi – mastering engineer (track 4)
Waudio Mastering – mastering engineer (track 4)

Charts

Certifications

Release history

References

2016 songs
2016 singles
2016 debut EPs
Alma (Finnish singer) songs
Songs written by Alma (Finnish singer)
Virgin Records singles
Virgin Records EPs
Alma (Finnish singer) albums
Pop music EPs